Milan Orlowski (born 7 September 1952 in Prague) is a former Czech table tennis player.

Table tennis career
From 1972 to 1986, Orlowski won several medals in singles, doubles, and team events in the Table Tennis European Championships and in the World Table Tennis Championships

He won a silver medal at the 1985 World Table Tennis Championships in the men's doubles with Jindřich Panský.

He also won two English Open titles.

See also
 List of table tennis players
 List of World Table Tennis Championships medalists

References

1952 births
Living people
Sportspeople from Prague
Czech male table tennis players
Czechoslovak table tennis players